Providence Presbyterian Church of Bustleton is an historic church in the Bustleton section of Florence Township, Burlington County, New Jersey, United States.

It was built in 1863 and added to the National Register of Historic Places in 1988.

See also
National Register of Historic Places listings in Burlington County, New Jersey

References

Churches on the National Register of Historic Places in New Jersey
Gothic Revival church buildings in New Jersey
Churches completed in 1863
19th-century Presbyterian church buildings in the United States
Churches in Burlington County, New Jersey
Florence Township, New Jersey
National Register of Historic Places in Burlington County, New Jersey
New Jersey Register of Historic Places